The Roewe i5 is a subcompact car produced by SAIC Motor since 2017. Available as a sedan and as an electric station wagon, the latter was first introduced via the electric station wagon version, the Roewe Ei5, the compact station wagon debuted on the 2017 Guangzhou Auto Show.

For export markets, the model is marketed under the British MG Motor marque. The sedan model is sold as the MG5 while the battery electric estate variant is sold in Europe as the MG5 EV and in Thailand as the MG EP or MG ES.

Overview
The Roewe i5 (MG5 in export markets) is a petrol-powered model and is only available as a petrol-powered sedan, while the battery electric Ei5 is only available as a station wagon. The engines for the i5 are the same 1.5-litre inline-4 petrol engine and 1.5-litre inline-4 turbocharged petrol engine from the Buick Excelle GX.

2021 facelift
The i5 received a facelift for the 2021 model year in China featuring redesigned front and rear end designs, new alloys and interior trims.

i5 GT
A sportier trim was unveiled during the 2021 Chengdu Auto Show called the Roewe i5 GT. The i5 GT features the same powertrain as the base i5 sedan while features redesigned front and rear bumpers with larger grilles.

Roewe Ei5 (EP22)
The Roewe Ei5 is the electric station wagon version of the Roewe i5. Debuting during the 2017 Guangzhou Auto Show, the Chinese version is powered by a single electric motor producing .

The Ei5 was launched in the UK rebranded as the MG5 EV in September 2020, with a more powerful,  electric motor and a  top speed.

2021 facelift
The Ei5 received a facelift for the 2021 model year in China featuring redesigned front and rear end designs, new alloys, interior trims and the updated Roewe R badging. The battery capacity is 61 kWh. Like the pre-facelift model, it is sold in Europe as the MG5. Then in 13 March 2023 The Ei5 Facelift Sold in Thailand name MG ES.

References

External links

Compact cars
Station wagons
Electric vehicles
i5
Cars introduced in 2017
Front-wheel-drive vehicles
Cars of China
Production electric cars